Tolpuddle is a village in Dorset, England, on the River Piddle from which it takes its name,  east of Dorchester, the county town, and  west of Poole. The estimated population in 2013 was 420.

The village was home to the Tolpuddle Martyrs, six men who were sentenced to be transported to Australia after they formed a friendly society in 1833.  A row of cottages, housing agricultural workers and a museum, and a row of seated statues commemorate the martyrs.  The annual Tolpuddle Martyrs festival is held in the village on the third weekend of July. An ancient sycamore tree on the village green, known as the Martyrs' Tree, is said to be the place where the Martyrs swore their oath. It is cared for by the National Trust.

St John the Evangelist's Parish Church dates from the 13th century.

In 1999, the A35 trunk road through south Dorset, was moved to bypass the village.

References
 Pitt-Rivers, Michael, 1969.  Dorset.  London: Faber & Faber.

Notes

External links

Villages in Dorset